Du'a al-Sabah (literally the supplication of Sabah,  orison of the morning) is a prayer advised by the first Imam of the Shiites, Ali ibn Abi Talib, to be recited in the morning. This prayer was written on the 28th of September in the year 646 (11th of Dhu al-Hijjah in the year 25 AH) by Ali ibn Abi Talib, learned from Muhammad ibn Abdullah, the Prophet of Islam. Du'a al-Sabah is mentioned by Mohammad-Baqer Majlesi in his books Bihar al-Anwar and Salah. In a treatise by Yahya ibn Qasim Alavi (seventh century AH), it is claimed that a copy of this prayer was written in Kufic script by Imam Ali himself. The oldest authentication related to the Du'a al-Sabah is the book "Ikhtiar al-Misbah" written by "Sayyid Ali ibn al-Husayn ibn Hessan ibn al-Baqi al-Qurashi" in 1255 (653 AH).

This prayer is also known as the Du'a al-Sabah of Amir al-Mu'minin, and most of the material contained in this prayer, is consistent with the teachings of "Quran and Islamic narrations" and has been mentioned in other prayers. Mohammad-Baqer Majlesi advised to recite this prayer after the dawn salah; Sayyid ibn Baqi also recommends reciting it after the dawn supererogatory salah.

Text

The text of the Du'a al-Sabah is as follows:

See also

References

External links
 Supplication of Sabah in English
 Al-Sabah Supplication - WikiShia
 Dua Al-Sabaah: Imam Ali's Supplication for the Morning
 Dua Sabah - Al-Islam.org
 Dua Al Sabah with English translation - YouTube

Islamic terminology
Islamic prayer
Shia prayers